Kfar Jarra,  is a small village in the Jezzine District of the South Governorate of Lebanon, about 50 km  south of Beirut.

History
In 1838, Eli Smith noted  Kefr Jerra,  as a village located in "Aklim et-Tuffah, adjacent to Seida".

In 1875, Victor Guérin travelled in the area, and noted: "I arrive at Kefr Djerra, a village of about twenty Maronite families, on a hill whose slopes are occupied by orchards. Several ancient cisterns dug into the rock and some of the materials that were used to build the church, which I am told is one hundred and forty years old, prove that this village succeeded another older one."

References

Bibliography

External links
Kfar Jarra, localiban

Populated places in Jezzine District